The 1911 Florida Gators football team represented the University of Florida during the 1911 college football season. The season was George Pyle's third as the head coach of the University of Florida football team. The University of Florida adopted the "Florida Gators" nickname for its sports teams in 1911; the earlier Florida football teams were known simply as "Florida" or the "Orange and Blue."  Pyle's newly christened Florida Gators finished their sixth varsity football season 5–0–1—the first, and to date, the only undefeated season in the history of the Florida Gators football program.

It was a pivotal year in the growth of the young Florida football program.  Florida played four different college football teams from the state of South Carolina, including The Citadel Bulldogs, the South Carolina Gamecocks, the Clemson Tigers and the College of Charleston Cougars, and finished 3–0–1 against the four South Carolina college teams and returned home to Gainesville to celebrate with their new nickname: the "Florida Gators."

The 1911 season also saw the debut of Florida's first on-campus home field, University Athletic Field, which consisted of low bleachers on cleared land along University Avenue. Previously, the university's football and baseball teams had played their home games at The Ballpark, the city's municipal park in downtown Gainesville.

Before the season

The team was captained by Neal "Bo Gator" Storter.  The team was also the first to use the nickname "Gators."  He is as such one reason given for the nickname.  A former player Roy Corbett sent a letter to The Gainesville Sun congratulating the 1928 team and mentioned the nickname coming from Storter. Carl Van Ness's research also posits Storter as the name's origin. Storter himself denied the above and stated the nickname 'Gators' came when a Macon Telegraph reporter declared "Macon to be invaded by a bunch of alligators from Florida" before the game with Mercer in 1910.

Schedule

Season summary

The Citadel
The season opened with a 15–3 victory over The Citadel Bulldogs at the first game on University Athletic Field.

South Carolina

Sources:

In the second week of play, Florida fought the South Carolina Gamecocks to a 6–6 tie. Earle Taylor scored in the first quarter and the Gamecocks matched in the second.

The starting lineup was Swanson (left end), Coarsey (left tackle), Lawler (left guard), Storter (center), Hancock (right guard), Bullock (right tackle), Buie (right end), Shackleford (quarterback), Davis (left halfback), Taylor (right halfback), Tenney (fullback).

Clemson

Sources:

Florida upset the Clemson Tigers by a single point, 6–5, in the two school's first-ever meeting. "The game as a whole, was a poor exhibition of football." Clemson scored in the first six minutes when Webb took it over. Towards the end of the fourth quarter, the Gators' Dummy Taylor picked up a fumble and ran 45 yards for a touchdown, and then kicked the extra point to win. Norm Carlson called it "Florida's first road win against a quality college opponent."

On the winning extra point, the holder Sam Buie recalled "Doc Walker of Jacksonville bet Captain Hill of Georgia Tech, the referee, that Dummy would make it. They bet, and Dummy kicked it." "It was on the South Carolina trip that the Florida team was dubbed the ‘Alligators,’ and the battle that took place . . .between the Clemson Tigers and the Florida Alligators is one long to be remembered!" declared the Florida Pennant.

The starting lineup was Bonus (left end), Bullock (left tackle), Wilson (left guard), Storter (center), Baker (right guard), Hancock (right tackle), Buie (right end), Shackleford (quarterback), Davis (left halfback), Taylor (right halfback), Tenney (fullback).

Columbia College
Florida beat  Columbia College 9–0. Taylor kicked three field goals. The starting lineup was Buie (left end), Hancock (left tackle), Wilson (left guard), Storter (center), Aker (right guard), Coarsey (right tackle), Swanson (right end), Shackleford (quarterback), Gavis (left halfback), Taylor (right halfback), Tenney (fullback).

Stetson

Sources:

Florida beat Stetson 26–0. The Stetson Weekly Collegiate called it "the greatest football game ever played in the state of Florida." Taylor drop kicked a 45-yard field goal and ran for two touchdowns.

The starting lineup was Swanson (left end), Coarsey (left tackle), Baker (left guard), Storter (center), Wilson (right guard), Bullock (right tackle), Buie (right end), Shackleford (quarterback), Tenney (left halfback), Taylor (right halfback), Pound (fullback).

Charleston
Florida closed the season with a 21–0 defeat of  Charleston. "Florida should have made at least three more touchdowns."

Postseason

The Gators proclaimed themselves "champions of South Carolina" as well as the state of Florida.

Earle "Dummy" Taylor, the only five-letter winner in team history, scored 49 of the season's 84 points (including a school-record eight field goals). He scored 25 points on the ground and points-after, and 24 on field goals. He also threw two touchdown passes.

Personnel

Linemen

Backfield

Subs

Scoring leaders

Coaching staff
Head coach: George E. Pyle
Manager: Roswell King

References

Bibliography
 
 

Florida
Florida Gators football seasons
College football undefeated seasons
Florida Gators football